Christ Episcopal Church  is an historical church in Williamsport, Pennsylvania.  It was founded in 1841 as the first Episcopal Church of Williamsport. The church building was consecrated in 1843.  It has a distinctive characteristic as the high-church or Anglo-catholic Episcopal parish in the city.  Its sanctuary is regarded as one of the most beautiful classical worship spaces in central Pennsylvania, being appointed with several genuine Tiffany stained-glass windows, encaustic tilework, and much fine brass and artisanal woodwork.  It is also noted historically for the tenure of its eleventh Rector, the Rev. Dr. John Henry Hopkins, Jr., composer of the beloved Epiphany Hymn "We Three Kings of Orient Are."

References

External links 

Episcopal churches in Pennsylvania
Buildings and structures in Williamsport, Pennsylvania
Churches in Lycoming County, Pennsylvania
Churches completed in 1843
19th-century Episcopal church buildings
1841 establishments in Pennsylvania
Anglo-Catholic church buildings in the United States